The Nokia C5-00 is the first in the new (at the time) Cseries of Nokia phones, announced March 2010. The C5-00 is a smartphone with messaging and social networking features, including, for example, Facebook and Flickr applications. The C5-00 allows multitasking and has a  display and a 5.0-megapixel camera (C5-00.2: 5 MP). It also includes GPS and a free navigation courtesy of Ovi Maps. It runs on Symbian OS with S60 3rd Edition Feature Pack 2.

It has a MicroSD slot with support for up to 16-gigabyte cards (C5-00.2: 32 GB) – the Nokia C5 comes with a two-gigabyte card in the box. It has a working memory (RAM) of 128 MB (C5-00.2: 256 MB).

Available in white and warm grey, the Nokia C5-00 was made globally available in the second quarter of 2010.

The C5-00 comes in a monoblock form factor and weighs  with the battery. It has a 5-way Navi-key, two soft keys, separate call, end clear and application keys as well as volume keys on the side. The phone user interface and the ring tones can be customized.

The announced maximum talk time varies from 4.9 hours in 3G networks to up to 12 hours in plain GSM networks. The maximum standby times are 630 and 670 hours respectively. Music can be played for a maximum of 34 hours if the phone is in the offline mode.

The phone features Bluetooth connectivity, a 3.5 mm AV connector and a stereo FM radio. It can act as a data modem, supports calendar and contact synchronization with Microsoft Outlook and can be charged via USB. Conference calls with up to three participants can also be made.

The Nokia C5-00 also features an integrated web browser. It supports the XHTML markup language, Flash Lite 3.0, video streaming and RSS feeds.

The camera on the back has a flash with an announced operating range of 1.5 meters. The camera has a few different capture, colour tone, scene and white balance modes and has a horizontal orientation. There is also a photo editor on device. Video can be captured for as long as there is memory available. The device also features a secondary, VGA resolution camera for video calls.

The Nokia C5-00.2 as of 2011 comes with a 5-megapixel camera, 256 MB RAM and support for up to 32-gigabyte cards.

References

External links

 Specs at GSM Arena, includes pictures

Nokia smartphones
Portable media players
Handwriting recognition
S60 (software platform)
Digital audio players
Personal digital assistants
Mobile phones introduced in 2010
Devices capable of speech recognition
Mobile phones with user-replaceable battery

de:Nokia CSeries#Nokia C5-00